Lick may refer to:

 Licking, the action of passing the tongue over a surface

Places
 Lick (crater), a crater on the Moon named after James Lick
 1951 Lick, an asteroid named after James Lick
 Lick Township, Jackson County, Ohio, United States

People
 Lick (surname), people with "Lick" as a surname
 Dennis Lick (born 1954), American professional football lineman
 James Lick (1796–1876), American carpenter, land baron, and patron of the sciences
 J. C. R. Licklider (1915–1990), American computer scientist, nicknamed "Lick"

Music
 Lick (album), by The Lemonheads
 Lick (band), an American band, fl. 1990s
 Lick (music), a short phrase, or series of notes, often improvised by a musician
 The Lick, a jazz lick, commonly known as 'The Lick'
 "Lick" (Joi song), 2002
 "Lick" (Shenseea and Megan Thee Stallion song), 2022

Nature
 Lick (stream), a small or ephemeral stream
 Salt lick, a salt deposit that animals regularly lick

Other uses
 Lick's Homeburgers, a Canadian restaurant chain
 Lick Observatory, an astronomical observatory in California named after James Lick
 The Lick with Trevor Nelson, a British music television show presented by Trevor Nelson

See also
 Lick High School (disambiguation)
 Licking (disambiguation)